Rostam Bastuni (15 March 1923 – 26 April 1994) was an Israeli politician and journalist, and the first Israeli Arab to represent a Zionist party in the Knesset.

Biography
Bastuni was born in Haifa to a family originally from al-Tira. He attended the Technion, graduating with a degree in architecture, going on to become a teacher.

Going into politics, Bastuni joined the Arab branch of Mapam in 1951. He rose through the party ranks, and although not elected, he served as the party's secretary in the first Knesset. He also edited the Arabic edition of Mapam's weekly magazine, Al-Fajar.

For the 1951 elections he was placed high enough on their list to win a place in the Knesset, thus becoming the first Israeli Arab to represent a Zionist party (three Arab MKs had served in the first Knesset, but none of them for Zionist parties - one had been a member of the communist Maki and the other two were members of an Arab party, the Democratic List of Nazareth).

During his first Knesset term, internal divisions over the Slánský trial led to Mapam splitting. On 20 February 1951, Bastuni left the party and set up the Left Faction with Adolf Berman and Moshe Sneh. However, whilst Berman and Sneh went on to join Maki, Bastuni returned to Mapam on 1 November 1954.

Bastuni lost his seat in the 1955 elections and did not return to the Knesset. In 1963 his nephew, Hassan Boustouni, became the first Arab to play in the top tier of Israeli football when he debuted for Liga Leumit club Maccabi Haifa F.C. Later, he served as an advisor in the Ministry of Housing on issues pertaining to Arab settlements. He was also dedicated to furthering Jewish-Arab harmony, and in 1966 he founded the Actions Committee of Israeli Arabs for Israel. In 1969, he emigrated to the United States, where he became an advocate of the one-state solution, publishing his views in The New York Times in 1972. He later taught Middle Eastern history at the State University of New York and became the chief architect of the New York City College of Technology.

He died in 1994 at the age of 71.

References

External links

1923 births
1994 deaths
20th-century Israeli architects
20th-century Israeli civil servants
20th-century Israeli educators
20th-century journalists
Arab members of the Knesset
Canaanites (movement)
Israeli emigrants to the United States
Left Faction politicians
Mapam politicians
Members of the 2nd Knesset (1951–1955)
People from Tirat Carmel
State University of New York faculty
Technion – Israel Institute of Technology alumni